Clear Spring Mill is a historic mill complex located at Franklin Township, York County, Pennsylvania.  The complex includes the grist mill, sawmill, and corn crib.  The grist mill was built in 1886, and is a 2 1/2-story, heavy timber frame building on a banked sandstone foundation.  It has a gambrel roof and three interior levels.  The sawmill was built about 1809, and is a one-story timber frame building on a foundation of banked stone, stone piers, and wood posts. It measures 12 feet deep by 40 feet wide, with a rear porch extension.  The corncrib was built about 1930.

It was added to the National Register of Historic Places in 1997.

References

Grinding mills on the National Register of Historic Places in Pennsylvania
Industrial buildings completed in 1886
Buildings and structures in York County, Pennsylvania
Grinding mills in Pennsylvania
National Register of Historic Places in York County, Pennsylvania